The Kevin Lynch Award of the Massachusetts Institute of Technology's Department of Urban Studies and Planning, established in 1988, is named in honor of the urban planner and author Kevin A. Lynch. It is given to individuals or organizations which contribute to research in city form.

Honorees

Starting in 2014, the awards have been presented in five categories. Earlier awards have been retroactively assigned to these categories.

Past winners:

Technology and Media in City Imaging

Jennifer Pahlka and Code for America (2014)
Manuel Castells (2001)
Richard Saul Wurman (1991)

Ecological Sustainability in City Form

 Randolph T. Hester (2011)
 Richard M. Daley (2005)

Preservation and Change in City Image

Barnaby Evans and William D. Warner (2003)
Allan Jacobs (1999)
William L. MacDonald (1989)

Justice and Efficiency in City Design

 City of Vancouver Planning Department (2007)
 Allan Heskin (1990s)
 Eric Wolf (1989)

Urban Events and Ephemera

Barnaby Evans (2003)
Boston’s First Night (1990)

External links

 Official site

Notes

Urban planning
Awards established in 1988
1988 establishments in Massachusetts
Massachusetts Institute of Technology